The Grand Enchantment Trail (acronym "GET") is a wilderness recreation trail running  between Phoenix, Arizona and Albuquerque, New Mexico.  It crosses the Arizona Trail and Continental Divide Trail and at Albuquerque it meets the Rio Grande Trail and El Camino Real de Tierra Adentro.

External links
GET official website - www.GrandEnchantmentTrail.org
Trail Segments - HikeArizona.COM
Trailheads Map - HikeArizona.COM

Hiking trails in Arizona
Long-distance trails in the United States
Hiking trails in New Mexico